Jana Veselá (born on 31 December 1983) is a Czech professional basketball player currently playing in the Czech League for ZVVZ USK Prague. She has played the Summer Olympics, the World Championship and the Eurobasket with the Czech Republic women's national basketball team, and she has won the Euroleague Women twice with Gambrinus Brno and Ros Casares Valencia, and the 2010 WNBA with Seattle Storm. She is 1.94 meters tall and plays as a forward.

References

External links

 Player profile

1983 births
Living people
Basketball players at the 2004 Summer Olympics
Basketball players at the 2008 Summer Olympics
Basketball players at the 2012 Summer Olympics
Czech expatriate basketball people in Spain
Czech expatriate basketball people in Turkey
Czech expatriate basketball people in the United States
Czech women's basketball players
Olympic basketball players of the Czech Republic
Ros Casares Valencia players
Seattle Storm players
Power forwards (basketball)
Small forwards
Sportspeople from Prague